Antonio Pons Campuzano (10 November 1897 – 12 January 1980) was in charge of the executive power of Ecuador from August to September 1935.

External links
 Official Website of the Ecuadorian Government about the country President's History

1897 births
1980 deaths
Presidents of Ecuador
People from Guayaquil